"Never Gonna Say I'm Sorry" is a song by Swedish band Ace of Base, released as a single on 11 March 1996. It was the third single taken from the band's second album, The Bridge (1995). In Europe, the song peaked at number six in Hungary, number 12 in Denmark and number 17 in Finland. In the US, it reached number six on the Billboard Bubbling Under Hot 100 Singles chart. And in Canada, it peaked at number 53 on the Canadian Hot 100 chart.

Background
The song was written by band member Jonas Berggren, who was hoping to reproduce the flavour of their 1993 hit "All That She Wants". He specifically mentions the similarities between the two songs in the liner notes of the booklet for The Bridge album. He said, "We decided early on to do an "All That She Wants" arrangement and drums because it's always fun to have something old on a new record."

Chart performance
"Never Gonna Say I'm Sorry" didn't reach the same level of success as "Lucky Love" and "Beautiful Life", but was a notable hit. It made it to the top 10 in Hungary, where it hit number six. Additionally, the single was a top 20 hit in Denmark and Finland, a top 30 hit in the band's native Sweden and a top 40 hit in Iceland. It didn't chart on the UK Singles Chart in the UK, but peaked at number 78 on the Eurochart Hot 100. Outside Europe, "Never Gonna Say I'm Sorry" reached number seven on the RPM Dance/Urban chart and number 53 on the Canadian Hot 100 in Canada, number six on the Billboard Bubbling Under Hot 100 Singles chart and number 18 on the Billboard Hot Dance Music/Maxi-Singles Sales chart in the United States, number 12 in Chile and number 79 in Australia.

Critical reception
J.D. Considine from The Baltimore Sun felt that the song "tops its "All That She Wants"-style arrangement with a vocal so tinged with regret that it's hard not to wince at the irony in lines like "I will make you happy, make you laugh."" Steve Baltin from Cash Box wrote that songs like "Never Gonna Say I'm Sorry" "work because the band downplays the dance sound, displaying some nice understated pop hooks." Larry Flick from Billboard described it as a "wise single selection" from the act's current album, The Bridge. He added that it "takes this Swedish foursome right back where they began—chirping atop a glossy reggae/pop melody that instantly triggers memories of the breakthrough hit "All That She Wants". It worked once, and chances are good that it will work again. Even the act's harshest critics will have to admit that the hook is instantly memorable." 

Dave Sholin from the Gavin Report concluded with that "by providing the planet with all that it wants in the realm of pop music, this Swedish foursome has yet to disappoint its ever-growing legion of fans. Thanks to the creative power of Jonas Berggren, the Ace of Base sound remains distinctive without getting stale. Early spins paint a positive future for single number three from The Bridge." Robbie Daw from Idolator described it as a "bouncy" tune. Brian A. Gnatt from The Michigan Daily stated that the song "carries through with the good ol' familiar style". Pan-European magazine Music & Media noted it as a "mid-tempo dance tune with a dominant, deep beat and the bouncy melodies which have become Ace of Base's musical trademark. Short and snappy, this single can be played at any time of the day." Bob Waliszewski of Plugged In commented in his review, that on the song, "the singer refuses to compromise who she is". Chuck Campbell from Scripps Howard News Service wrote that "Never Gonna Say I'm Sorry" "is an unapologetic and propulsive reworking of the band's "All That She Wants". It stands to be another smash."

Music video
The accompanying music video for the song was directed by British director Richard Heslop and released in 1996. The video includes computer-generated imagery and mirror effects designed to make the video feel like a funhouse, much like the video for ABBA's "SOS". In the USA the video was never released as Arista Records was dissatisfied with the video and opted not to release one to accompany the single release.

In Europe the single was accompanied by a short promotion tour by the band and two alternate videos. In the USA the only promotion consisted of tiny misspelled stickers on the CD packaging, although the record company did send out promotional copies of the Sweetbox Radio Mix to radio stations. With the band members away in Europe and with no other form of promotion, the single failed to enter the official US charts, peaking at #106. It was the first Ace of Base single to fail to chart inside of the Top 40 in the US.

Though the US version of the "Lucky Love" video was filmed later, "Never Gonna Say I'm Sorry" was chronologically the last video that was released with major participation from Malin. It was later published on Ace of Base's official YouTube channel in January 2015. As of August 2022, the video has amassed more than 20 million views on Youtube.

Track listings

 Australian CD single
"Never Gonna Say I'm Sorry" (Short Version) – 3:16
"Never Gonna Say I'm Sorry" (Long Version) – 6:34
"Never Gonna Say I'm Sorry" (Rock Version) – 4:02
"Never Gonna Say I'm Sorry" (Sweetbox Funky Mix) – 6:46

 United States Maxi single
"Never Gonna Say I'm Sorry" – 3:16
"Never Gonna Say I'm Sorry" (Sweetbox Extended Mix) – 6:46
"Never Gonna Say I'm Sorry" (Lenny B's Club Mix) – 8:24
"Never Gonna Say I'm Sorry" (Lenny B's Organ-ic House Mix) – 7:14

Official versions/remixes
 Album version / short version / original version – 3:16
 Lenny B's club mix – 8:24
 Lenny B's Organ-ic House mix – 7:14
 Long version / extended – 6:34
 Rock version – 4:02
 Sweetbox funky mix / Sweetbox extended mix – 6:46
 Sweetbox radio edit

Charts

Personnel
 Vocals by Linn Berggren and Jenny Berggren 
 StabGuitar by Chuck Anthony
 Music by Jonas Berggren 
 Lyrics by Jonas Berggren
 Produced by Denniz Pop, Max Martin and Jonas Berggren
 Recorded and produced at Cheiron Studios

Release history

Notes

External links

Ace of Base songs
1995 songs
1996 singles
Mega Records singles
Music videos directed by Richard Heslop
Song recordings produced by Denniz Pop
Song recordings produced by Max Martin
Songs written by Jonas Berggren